Philip Davis or Phil Davis may refer to:
Phil Davis (fighter) (born 1984), American mixed martial artist and former collegiate wrestler
Phil Davis (actor) (born 1953), English actor
Phil Davis (cartoonist) (1906–1964), American illustrator
Phil Davis (Australian footballer) (born 1990), Australian rules footballer for the Greater Western Sydney Giants
Philip Davis (Bahamian politician) (born 1951), Bahamian politician
Philip Davis (Australian politician) (born 1952)
Philip J. Davis (1923–2018), American mathematician
Phil Davis (footballer, born 1944), retired English professional footballer
Philip Davis, Library of America editor for Bernard Malamud volumes
Percy Davis (Kent cricketer) (1922–2018), who was known as Philip Davis in later life
 Philip A. Davis, astronomer and planetary geologist with the U.S. Geological Survey. Minor planet 4448 Phildavis named after him.
Phil Davis, fictional musical showman played by actor Danny Kaye in the 1954 film White Christmas

See also
Philip Davies (disambiguation)